"Mornin' Ride" is a song written by Steve Bogard and Jeff Tweel, and recorded by American country music artist Lee Greenwood.  It was released in November 1986 as the second single from the album Love Will Find Its Way to You.  The song was Greenwood's seventh number one  country single.  The single went to number one for one week and spent a total of fifteen weeks on the country chart. Vince Gill and Larry Stewart sang background vocals on this song.

Charts

Weekly charts

Year-end charts

References

1986 singles
Lee Greenwood songs
MCA Records singles
Songs written by Jeff Tweel
Songs written by Steve Bogard
Song recordings produced by Jerry Crutchfield
1986 songs